A Submarine Pirate is a 1915 American short comedy film starring Syd Chaplin and featuring an early uncredited appearance by Harold Lloyd.

Cast
 Syd Chaplin as Ambitious waiter
 Wesley Ruggles as The inventor's accomplice
 Glen Cavender as A shrewd inventor
 Phyllis Allen as A pugnacious guest
 Virginia Fox
 Edgar Kennedy
Josh Binney as Hotel Manager
 Harold Lloyd as Cook
 Heinie Conklin
 Fritz Schade
 Ted Edwards as Waiter (uncredited)

See also
 Harold Lloyd filmography

References

External links

TCM Overview

1915 films
American silent short films
1915 comedy films
1915 short films
American black-and-white films
Films directed by Charles Avery
Films directed by Sydney Chaplin
Pirate films
Submarine films
Silent American comedy films
Articles containing video clips
American comedy short films
Surviving American silent films
1910s American films
Silent adventure films